Sophus Hagen   (3 May 1842 – 1929) was a Danish composer.

See also
List of Danish composers

References
This article was initially translated from the Danish Wikipedia.

Danish composers
Danish music historians
Male composers
1842 births
1929 deaths